Drago Grdenić (31 August 1919 – 7 September 2018) was a Croatian chemist and academician and the founder of X-ray crystallography in Croatia. Over the course of his career he determined the structure of a number of mercury complexes and organomercury compounds. He introduced the effective coordination of mercury atom and set rules for structural chemistry of mercury.

References

1919 births
2018 deaths
Croatian chemists
Faculty of Science, University of Zagreb alumni
Members of the Croatian Academy of Sciences and Arts
People from Križevci
Crystallographers
Yugoslav scientists